Daniel Felsenfeld (born January 5, 1970) is a composer of contemporary classical music and a writer.

Biography

Felsenfeld was born in Washington, D.C., raised primarily in Southern California and currently resides in Brooklyn with his wife, writer Elizabeth Isadora Gold and kid August.  He attended the University of California, Santa Barbara where he got his undergraduate degree in composition studying with Margaret Mayer.  He did his Masters and Doctoral work at the New England Conservatory where he studied with Arthur Berger and Lee Hyla. He is a composer and is also an author, having written three books published by Amadeus Press as well as hundreds of articles.  In 2007 a "Talk of the Town" piece in The New Yorker magazine noted several writers whom Felsenfeld met at the MacDowell Colony who used his last name in their novels. He taught at the City College of New York.

Music

Orchestral music
The Dresden Soul Symphony (2008, with Larry Gold) for orchestra, chorus, rock band, and four soul singers
Insomnia Redux; 4am (2005) for orchestra
Thursday Night Overture (1999) for chamber orchestra
The Bridge (2003) for soprano and chamber orchestra
Summer and All it Brings (2002) solo cantata for soprano, narrator and chamber orchestra
Busmeat: A Parable (1998) for orchestra
Nicotine Sinfonietta (1997 for chamber orchestra
Bad Coffee Serenade (1994) concerto for violin and chamber orchestra

Opera
Exposure (2020) for two sopranos, bass clarinet and marimba, libretto by Bea Goodwin
The Last of Manhattan (2004) for singers and chamber ensemble, libretto by Ernest Hilbert
Summer and All it Brings (2002) for soprano, narrator, harpsichord and cello, libretto by Ernest Hilbert
Thursday Night: Suite from an Abandoned Opera (1999) for singers and chamber orchestra

Chamber music
"You.Have.No.Idea" (2009–10) for string quartet
All Work and No Play (2007) for piccolo and piano
Life Shrinks (2007) for piano, cello and percussion—music for dance
Living Room Suite (2006) for string trio
For Stephanie (2006) for string quartet
First Scenes from Red Room (2006) for violin and piano
From Maldoror (2003) for flute, oboe, piano and narrator
I Conquered Egypt (2000) for piano trio
Let Me Out (1999) for timpani, cello and bass clarinet
Live ‘Til Twilight (1999) for cello and piano
Fast Living (1999) for cello and percussion
Cultivating Cool (1999) for flute, clarinet, trumpet, piano, percussion and double bass
Smoking My Diploma (1998) for oboe, cello and piano
Looking for Funny Dog (1998) for flute and organ
O I LIKE the LIFE that I’m LEADING (1997) for flute and piano
Something Very Serious (1995) for violin and piano
Don’t Call me Sir (1994) for clarinet and piano
Bad Coffee Serenade (1994) for violin and piano

Solo music
Down to You Is Up, Three Movements for solo piano (1999)
Air That Kills for solo violin (2000)
A Dirty Little Secret for solo piano (2003)
Insomnia Redux; 4am for solo piano (2003)
Obsession No. 1: Toscanini’s Glasses for solo piano (2008)
The Cohen Variations for solo piano (2009)
Hooked to the Silver Screen for solo viola (2011)

Vocal music
"From Sleepless Nights" (2009) for mezzo-soprano and cello
In My Craft and Sullen Art (2008) for soprano and piano
The Poet's Dream of Herself as a Young Girl (2008) for mezzo-soprano and piano trio
Fall, Leaves, Fall (2007) for soprano and piano
“Aria” from Magnificat (2007) for soprano and piano
To a Cabaret Dancer (2007) for mezzo-soprano and piano
Dry Sandwiches (2007) for soprano and piano
Lines for Winter (2007) for tenor and piano
You Want a Social Life, With Friends (2007) for baritone and piano
Annus Mirabilis (2007) for bass and piano
True Love (2007) for soprano and organ
The Bridge (2003) cycle of five songs for soprano and piano; inspired by the poetry of W. H. Auden and Ernest Hilbert, and The Bridge of San Luis Rey by Thornton Wilder
New Forms of Control (2000) for female voices, two synthesizers, and percussion
I May Never Get Home (1999) cycle of seven songs for baritone and piano
Thank You, Goodnight (1999) cycle of five songs for soprano and piano
L’Envoi (1999) for soprano and piano
Sunday Night (1999) for soprano and piano
Elizabeth Among the Rains (1997) cycle of five songs for mezzo-soprano and piano
From the Letters of Heloise (1996) for soprano, clarinet, bass clarinet, percussion and strings
I Am Saturn (1997) cycle of three songs for soprano and piano
Equals (1996) for soprano and string quartet
Five Songs for Five Friends (1995) cycle of five songs for soprano and piano

Choral music
Revolutions of Ruin (2008) for SATB chorus with soprano and baritone soloists and chamber orchestra
Manhattan Choruses (2004) for SATB chorus and organ

Books
Antonio Vivaldi and the Baroque Tradition, with Donna Getzinger
Benjamin Britten and Samuel Barber: Their Lives and Music
Johannes Brahms and the Twilight of Romanticism, with Donna Getzinger
Richard Wagner and German Opera
George Frideric Handel and Music for Voices, with Donna Getzinger
Tchaikovsky: A Listener's Guide Book
Johann Sebastian Bach and the Art of Baroque Music with Donna Getzinger
Charles Ives and Aaron Copland—A Listener's Guide

References

External links

1970 births
20th-century classical composers
21st-century classical composers
American classical composers
American male classical composers
American opera composers
Male opera composers
Living people
New England Conservatory alumni
Writers from California
University of California, Santa Barbara alumni
20th-century American male musicians
21st-century American male musicians